Kesh was an ancient Sumerian city and religious site, whose patron goddess was Ninhursag. Its location is uncertain; some of the possible sites put forth include Al-Ubaid, near Ur, or Tell al-Wilayah near Adab or Abu Salabikh though the consensus is now with Tell al-Wilayah. The city is known to near to and was under the control of the ancient city of Irisaĝrig. Kesh in mentioned on the Bassetki Statue of Naram-Sin.

Temple Hymn
There is a famous Kesh temple hymn about Ninhursag's temple in Kesh (hur-saĝ gal), where she is called Nintud. The goddess Nisaba appears as the temple's caretaker and decision maker.A cuneiform tablet fragment of the Kesh Temple Hymn (the longer version, a shorter version having been written by Enheduanna, the  daughter  of Sargon  of Akkad) was found at Abu Salabikh.

Location
Robert D. Biggs suggested Kesh could have just been a variation in the spelling of Kish.
From inscriptions it is known that Adab was on the Kesh Canal. More recently it has been suggested that Kesh is located at Tulul al-Baqarat.

References

See also
Cities of the ancient Near East

Sumerian cities
Former populated places in Iraq